Curtis Park is a neighborhood located within the city of Sacramento, California. Curtis Park is defined as north of Sutterville Road, south of Broadway Ave., east of Freeport Boulevard, and west of Highway 99.  Curtis Park is a largely residential neighborhood. It is known for its charming vintage homes including Victorian, Bungalow, and 1920s revival style subdivisions.  Information about the neighborhood can be obtained from the Sierra Curtis Neighborhood Association.

Utility providers

 Water, Sewer, Garbage - City of Sacramento 
 Electric - SMUD
 Natural Gas - PG&E

Notable residents
Traditionally one of the more well-to-do neighborhoods in the city proper, Curtis Park has been home to many of Sacramento's best known citizens.

 Kevin Johnson- Mayor of Sacramento,  former NBA star
 Roger Dickinson—Assemblyman
 Dave Jones - California Insurance Commissioner, former State Assemblyman & Sacramento City Councilmember
 Gloria McLeod - California State Senator from Chino keeps a home in Curtis Park
 Raphael Saadiq musician
 Joe Serna the late mayor of Sacramento, lived here until his death
 Ray Eames - Childhood home of the designer

References

External links
Sacramento Wiki
City of Sacramento

Neighborhoods in Sacramento, California